Wolfsberg is a village and a former municipality in the district Ilm-Kreis, in Thuringia, Germany.

Wolfsberg was created in 1994 by uniting the former municipalities Bücheloh, Gräfinau-Angstedt and Wümbach. Since July 2018, Wolfsberg is part of the town Ilmenau.

References

Former municipalities in Thuringia
Ilm-Kreis